Victor Oluyemi Olatunji (born 5 September 1999) is a Nigerian footballer who plays in the Czech First League for FC Slovan Liberec on loan from AEK Larnaca as a forward.

Club career

FK Železiarne Podbrezová
Olatunji made his professional debut for Železiarne Podbrezová against Nitra on 16 February 2019. Olatunji came on after some hour of play, as a replacement for Daniel Pavúk. While on the pitch, Podbrezová sealed off the win 3–1, through a late goal by Lukáš Urbanič. On 19 May 2021 he signed a new two-year contract with AEK Larnaca.

References

External links
 FK Železiarne Podbrezová official club profile 
 
 Futbalnet profile 
 

1999 births
People from Sokoto
Living people
Nigerian footballers
Association football forwards
FK Inter Bratislava players
FK Železiarne Podbrezová players
SV Mattersburg players
FC Slovan Liberec players
Slovak Super Liga players
2. Liga (Slovakia) players
Alki Oroklini players
Cypriot Second Division players
Austrian Football Bundesliga players
Nigerian expatriate footballers
Expatriate footballers in Slovakia
Nigerian expatriate sportspeople in Slovakia
Expatriate footballers in Austria
Nigerian expatriate sportspeople in Austria
Expatriate footballers in Cyprus
Nigerian expatriate sportspeople in Cyprus
Expatriate footballers in the Czech Republic
Nigerian expatriate sportspeople in the Czech Republic